The Oklahoma City Stars men's basketball team is the basketball team that represents Oklahoma City University (OCU) in Oklahoma City, Oklahoma, United States.  The school's team currently competes in the Sooner Athletic Conference.

Oklahoma City competed in NCAA Division I for many years, and the program was especially noted for its success under coaches Doyle Parrack (1950–1955) and his successor Abe Lemons (1955–1973 and 1984–1990).  OCU appeared in eleven NCAA Men's Division I Basketball tournaments.

In 1985, the school moved from the NCAA to the NAIA and has since won six national championships.

National championships

Tournament results

NCAA tournament results
The Chieftains appeared in 11 NCAA Division I basketball tournaments from 1952 to 1973, making them the most prolific tournament team that is no longer in Division I. Their record in tournaments was 8-13, giving them the second most wins of non-DI teams after New York University.

NIT results

NAIA results

Note: The NAIA shifted from national to regional seeds in 2016.

References

External links